The Chess Players is an outdoor 1983 sculpture by Lloyd Lillie, installed in John Marshall Park in Washington, D.C., United States.

See also
 1983 in art
 List of public art in Washington, D.C., Ward 6

References

1983 establishments in Washington, D.C.
1983 sculptures
Cultural depictions of chess players
Judiciary Square
Outdoor sculptures in Washington, D.C.
Sculptures of men in Washington, D.C.
Statues in Washington, D.C.